Sofia Milos (born 27 September 1969) is a Swiss-born actress. She is best known for her role as Yelina Salas on CSI: Miami. She has also had a role on The Sopranos as Camorra boss Annalisa Zucca, as well as roles in TV series such as Curb your Enthusiasm, Friends and ER.

Early life
Milos was born in Zurich, Switzerland, to an Italian father and a Greek mother. The family moved to Rome when she was a child. When she was 14, she entered a local beauty pageant, and after winning first prize went on to win the provincial, regional and national contests as well, receiving the title Junior Lady Italy.

Milos studied business and economics at a school in Switzerland, and she studied acting at the Beverly Hills Playhouse under acting coach Milton Katselas.

Milos is fluent in seven languages.

Career 
When she was 15, Milos became a professional model to pay for her education in Switzerland. Her film debut came in Inside Out, an independent feature starring Kris Kristofferson and Lesley-Anne Down. Her television debut occurred in the NBC comedy Café Americain.

Filmography

Film

Television

References

External links
 

1969 births
Living people
American television actresses
American film actresses
American people of Greek descent
American people of Italian descent
American Scientologists
Swiss emigrants to Italy
People of Lazian descent
21st-century American women